Lasioglossum reticulatum is a species of sweat bee in the family Halictidae.#

Size 
The female is up to 8 mm long and the male Lasioglossum reticulatum is about 7 mm long.

Season 
Its season starts in March and ends in September. In Florida its season is all year.

References

Further reading

External links

 
 https://bugguide.net/node/view/369682

reticulatum
Articles created by Qbugbot
Insects described in 1892